György Sárosi (5 August 1912 – 20 June 1993) was a Hungarian footballer. Sárosi was a complete footballer renowned for his versatility and technique among other things, and he played in several positions for Ferencváros and the Hungary national team. Essentially a second striker, he could also operate in midfield or central defence, and he helped Ferencváros win five Hungarian league titles between 1932 and 1941. He is considered one of the greatest players of the pre-war era.

He scored a goal in the 1934 FIFA World Cup, but his finest hour came when he captained Hungary to the 1938 FIFA World Cup finals, where he scored five goals in the tournament, including one in the final to reduce Italy's lead to 3–2, although a Silvio Piola goal eventually finished off the Hungarians. He finished with the bronze ball for being the third-highest goalscorer of the tournament.

He was named the 60th European Player of the Century in the IFFHS Century Elections. He is also fifth in the all-time top-goalscorers list for the Hungarian national team, with 42 goals from 62 appearances.

After his retirement he moved to Italy, where he managed a number of clubs, including Genoa, Juventus, Bari and Roma. He was also manager of Lugano. He died in 1993 aged 80.

Early life 
Born Gyorgy Stefanicsics in Budapest on 5 August 1912, the family name was later changed to Sarosi to make them sound more Hungarian. His father was a tailor and raised three children (György, László and Béla). All three became  national team athletes. During his school years, in addition to football, he played tennis, table tennis, water polo and athletics. In addition to his perfect technical skills, he stood out from the field in terms of tactics and game intelligence.

He completed his schooling at the Eötvös High School in Reáltanoda Street. The school's football team was in the KISOK league. He was already playing here, with two of his later teammates, Hada and Lazarus. The coach of the Ferencváros youth team Zsazsa saw him play several times in the school team.

He joined Ferencvaros's youth ranks as a 15-year-old. When the capital giants wanted to tie him to a professional deal a couple of years later, though, the youngster had other ideas. "I wanted to become a lawyer," Sarosi recalled. "I saw football as something to play for fun, not a career. However, my father (who was struggling for work as a tailor) convinced me that too many people were losing jobs in the depression, and that I was good enough to make a real go of being a footballer."

Club career

1930-1932 : Rise to the first team 
Aged 18 years old, on 15 March 1931, he made his debut in the first team, in the Ferencváros - Bástya (7: 0) championship match. This is how the newspapers evaluated their performance after the match: "Sárosi turned out to be what we expected. Equivalent to a good Bukov, he is in a great location, has a great fit, has a high level of game intelligence, and is the main working judge, a developing centerhalf. He played a definite national team form." "He was only a boy, but on the pitch it seemed like he was the man playing against kids in the park," said Zoltan Blum, who handed Sarosi his bow. "It was just so easy to him. He was big, really strong, quick, never lost a header. He was impossible to bully. Moreover, he played with such confidence – even at that age he played with the confidence of a captain. He would stride out of the defence with the ball, taking on opponents and launching attacks."

His first league goal was in 1930-31 against the Pécs-Baranya on 17 and 24 May 1931.

Winning the 1931-32 championship was an unforgettable experience for Sárosi. He played in 19 out of 22 matches due to injury or illness. On 8 September 1932, the Hungarian Cup final was played on Hungária út. Hungária - Ferencváros 4-3. A game that Ferencváros lost.

1933-1938 His best years

Magyar Kupa final 
At the age of 20, György Sárosi was already one of the best players in the world, and had one of the best performances ever against Ujpest in the 1933 Magyar Kupa Final in which Ferencvaros won 11-1; Ujpest won the league that season. György Sárosi scored 3 goals and 4 assists, the newspapers gave him the best rating (1) as he was named the MVP of the game.

The evolution of Sárosi 
Because of his class on the ball, Sarosi was gradually deployed further forward in the FTC formation – first as an attacking midfielder, and then as a striker. It was in the former position that he headlined their inconceivable 11-1 thrashing of Ujpest, who had just won the league title, in the 1933 Hungarian Cup final, scoring a hat-trick and setting up another four goals. But it was in attack that he most often appeared during his 17 years in the green and white. There, he averaged at least a goal per game for eight successive seasons from 1935/36, and twice finished as top scorer in the Hungarian top flight. Sarosi also remains the most prolific marksman in the history of the Mitropa Cup, a prestigious competition for clubs from, among other countries, Austria, Czechoslovakia, Hungary and Italy – then all leading powers in European football.

From 15 December 1935 (Ferencváros - III. Ker. 5: 1), already as dr. György Sárosi was featured. In addition to sports, he also cared about his future, studying in his spare time because he wanted to graduate. During theMitropa Cup battles of 1935, Ferencváros was knocked out of the AS by Rome 3: 1 on June 16 in Rome. In the rebound on Üllői út on June 22 (Ferencváros - AS Róma 8: 0 (3: 0)), Sárosi scored 4 goals. In 1937, Ferencváros was the winner of Mitropa Cup. In the semi-finals, Austria was beaten out of Újpest. 18 July 1937 in Vienna: Austria - Ferencváros 4: 1. The Fradi played poorly, the Viennese were confident of making progress.

On 25 July on Üllői út: Ferencváros - Austria 6: 1 (2: 1). It was a miracle that eleven in Franciscan had accomplished. It must be overturned before the miracle, it cannot be explained professionally. Austria was considered one of the best Mitropa Cup teams of all time. The main force of Ferencváros was in the offensive line, in which dr. György Sárosi provided one of the greatest achievements of his player career. Sárosi was taken off their shoulders at the end of the match. The power of Fradi's amazing heart, which permeated the entire team, was further enhanced by the audience's sometimes ecstatic encouragement. In addition to the 11 players from Ferencváros, this enthusiastic audience was also part of the victory. Dr. Sárosi said: "The most beautiful match of my life. It feels great to have such sincere and great joy for so many people." when Mihály Pataki added : "Defeating this Austria is a colossal achievement that Europe as a whole is noticing."

"Gyurka", as he was nicknamed, helped Ferencvaros finish second in 1935 and 1938, and played the leading role in their 1937 triumph. In the first leg of the semi-final away to Austria Vienna, Sarosi did a good job containing iconic striker Matthias Sindelar, but he couldn't prevent injury-stricken FTC losing 4-1. A return to Budapest coincided with a return to the strike force for Sarosi, and he responded with an electrifying two-goal display as the hosts beat the defending champions 6-1 to go through 7-5 on aggregate.

Mitropa Cup final 
In 1937, Ferencváros had to play with Lazio in the Mitropa Cup final. The first match was on Üllői út on 12 September 1937: Ferencváros - Lazio 4: 2 (1: 1). The rematch on 24 October 1937 in Rome: Lazio - Ferencváros 4: 5 (4: 3). Piola scored a hat-trick in 17 minutes. They played in the pouring rain in the second half. The decisive turn was when Hada defended Piola's penalty with a 4: 3 lead to Lazio. Ten minutes later, Kiss leveled off. In the 80th minute, Dancer runs away and curves the ball between points 5 and 11. Sárosi dr. he runs towards the ball, his back to the goal, and suddenly pulls the ball to the goal with his right foot, which cuts halfway into the goal of Lazio. Sárosi dr. he said it was perhaps the most beautiful goal of his life. Ferencváros won the cup. In the ornament, the Italian president hands over the cup to Dr. Sárosi. Led by the "B" - middle, the Hungarian camp sings the Hungarian anthem ore. The team also sings, dr. she sings with tears streaming from her eyes. After the end of the national anthem, the "Gyurka, Gyurka" from the handful of Hungarian fan camps roared in the eternal city as well. The goal king of Mitropa Cup in 1937: dr. Sárosi with 12 goals and 2 assists. In the two legs, Sárosi scored 6 goals and distributed 1 assist. In the second leg, he was given a rating of 1 by the newspapers which makes him the MVP.

Quotes:"I had never seen a game like this in my life, I just learned what football is. — Giovanni Riccardi

"I considered Sárosi to be the greatest artist, but now I also consider him the best strategist. The smartest football player in the world!" — Referee Wüttrich

"The Ferencváros striker line is a magnificent instrument on which the unsurpassed leader, Sárosi, played the most beautiful melodies. Ferencváros deserved the victory perfectly." — II Piccolo

1939-1948 : Final years and retirement 
Ferencváros won the 1939/40 championship only with a goal difference and luck. In the last round Újpest - Hungária 3: 3 (1. FTC 39, 2. Hungária 39, 3. UTE 38). The 1940/41 championship was won by Dr. Sárosi. under his leadership, Ferencváros won by 11 points. Player of the year: dr. György Sárosi.

18 April 1948 Üllői út, Ferencváros - Vasas 2: 0. He played in this match for the last time in green and white on Üllői út. He said goodbye to his beloved audience with brilliant play. Did the "Gyurka, Gyurka" roar and was taken off the shoulder by the fans at the end of the match. No one knew it was his last match. The next day, Monday, 19 April, he left the country with a regular passport. He left for Italy and lived here until his death.

During his Ferencváros career, he played a total of 450 matches in which he scored 421 goals and distributed 190 assists.

International career

Start as a defender 
Sarosi's international career, began as an 18-year-old in a 3-2 loss to Yugoslavia in May 1931. In just his second Hungary appearance, the teenager shackled Czechoslovakia goal machine Antonin Puc as his country recorded a 3-0 win. Because of his infallible performances in defence, it was not until his 15th outing that Hungary experimented with Sarosi in attack. Predictably, he scored that day against Sweden.

World Cup 1934 
In 1934, György Sárosi played his first World Cup. Despite being injured in the first game against Egypt, he was fit to play in the quarters-final against Austria. Despite scoring a penalty at the 60th minute, Sárosi didn't play well in reason of his injury that still had an effect on his game. Hungary ended up losing the game 1-2. Nemzeti Sport was very harsh with Sárosi and criticized him for not being at his usual level:

Sárosi only played one game in that World Cup in which he managed to score a goal.

Hungary 8-3 Czechoslovakia
But if that day in Paris was not the jour de gloire Sarosi had craved, what remained his crowning Hungary exhibition was one any player would have been proud of. It unfolded in a Central European International Cup contest against Czechoslovakia in 1937. With Hungary trailing 2-1 past the half-hour mark, their infallible captain struck seven goals past Frantisek Planicka – arguably the finest goalkeeper on the planet – to seal an emphatic 8-3 victory.

"Scoring seven goals in an international is almost impossible, yet alone past the great Planicka," commented his coach that day, Karoly Dietz. "But 'Gyurka' was the greatest goalscorer of his era – just look at his statistics." In the evening at the banquet, Planicska was the first to congratulate Dr. Sárosi. With tears in his eyes, he rolled his neck and said: "For a player like you, it's not a shame, and I'll never deny it."

After the game, the newspapers gave him the rating of -1 to credit his amazing performance. Normally the system works like that: "1 = World class. 2 = Good. 3 = Average. 4 = Bad. 5 = Awful." But Képes Sport made an exception for Sárosi who scored 7 goals against the best goalkeeper in the world.

This 7-goal haul helped him to be the top goal scorer of the 1936–38 Central European Cup with a then-record of 10 goals (which was equalled in the next edition by fellow compatriot Ferenc Puskás). With a total of 17 goals in the Central European Cup, he is the competition's all-time top goalscorer.

World Cup 1938 
In the 1938 World Cup hosted in France. Sárosi's and Hungary's first game was against the Dutch East Indies, the final score was 6-0 and Sárosi scored twice, in the 25th and in the 89th minute. After the match, the Hungarian captain said: "They were stronger than we thought, but also rougher". Despite scoring twice, Sárosi wasn't much involved in the game. In the second game (Hungary - Switzerland 2:0), Sárosi scored again and Hungary went through the next round. This time Sárosi stepped up and was rated highly by the newspapers, yet he was expected to do even better in the next game considering his reputation. Against Sweden in the third game, Hungary won 5-1 and Sárosi delivered a brilliant performance scoring once and assisting 3 times against the Swedes, here is the description of his performance by Nemzeti Sport: "He (Sárosi) had almost reached the top of his form, and this was the mark of the shape-shifting he predicted [...] We had a lot of wonderful stunts from the Hungarian midfielder, who is starting to match his level in Paris [...] He released great long balls to the wind. All in all, he is a midfielder with a generous, phenomenal intelligence."

The 1938 World Cup final (Hungary - Italy) took place in the Stade Olympique de Colombes in Paris, an attendance of 55,000 people was registered. The stadium was not quite filled to capacity for the third World Cup final. After France's exit, interest in the tournament dwindled and this was reflected in the attendances for the later matches. However, the crowd was eager to see whether the Hungarians, with their flowing style of football and their captain György Sárosi, could halt Vittorio Pozzo's Italian side which boasted the outstanding centre-forward Silvio Piola. The score was already 3-1 in favour of Italians when Sárosi scored a well placed shot close to the 6 yard box in the 70th minute. Unfortunately for him and his teammates, Italy were known for their good defensive ability and managed to stop the Hungarians from attacking, the Golden Ball winner Silvio Piola scored the final goal of the 1938 World Cup at the 77th minute. Italy were crowned world champions for a second time in a row. Individually, Sárosi was showing a good vision and had a decent game but the Italian defence blocked most of his passes as the Nemzeti Sport described: "He (Sárosi) produced a few great things, throwing his peers in front of him with beautiful balls. His ideas are great. they were. But the design is already inferior to this fast and hard, all-down protection. His clever draws on this suffered a shipwreck. His passes were annoying because the Italian defenders could reach them sooner than the destinator." He was given a rating of 3 by newspapers which is equivalent to an "average" performance.

During the 1938 World Cup, Sárosi scored a total of 5 goals and delivered 3 assists in 4 games. He managed to score in every game of the knockout stage, an achievement matched only 84 years later, at the 2022 FIFA World Cup by Lionel Messi. His World Cup campaign is considered to be one of the greatest displays in Hungary's history.

Later life and death 
He first became the coach of Bari in 1948/49. His greatest success was winning a championship with the Juventus Guard in 1952. Until 1977, he worked for ten clubs. He later only dealt with young people.

In July 1976, he visited home for the first time. On 20 July, he was greeted by the Circle of Friends. It was an unforgettable experience. After his football career, Sárosi travelled a lot in Europe, when a journalist asked him what was the most beautiful city in the world, his answer was always one: "Ferencváros in Budapest . It was the narrower scene of the dreamy twenty years - the period of my football career - that I spent on the Üllői Úti field […] The story of Fradi, and my life is completely intertwined, intertwined within me."

He died on 19 June 1993 in Genoa and was buried there.

Style of play 

Sárosi is one of the most complete footballers ever, In the mid-1930s, he was named in European XIs published by La Gazzetta dello Sport, Kicker and L'Auto. And while there may be nothing surprising to that concurrence, there was a stupefying undercurrent to the three prestigious publications' selection of the Ferencvaros and Hungary stand-out: the former picked him at centre-back, the German magazine in midfield and the French sportspaper in attack. It was an emphatic testament to the fact that Sarosi did not just play in multiple positions, but could excel in them all.

Essentially an inside-forward and center-forward, he could also operate in midfield as a world-class center-half or even an international-class central defender, played these role in the early and the late career. Sarosi was an extraordinary dribbler and scorer with aggressive character, had got great physical option as a true leadership and very good teamwork ability

Career statistics

Club
Source:

International

International goals
Hungary score listed first, score column indicates score after each Sárosi goal.

Honours

Player

Club
Ferencváros
 Hungarian National Championship (5): 1932, 1934, 1938, 1940, 1941
 Hungarian Cup (4): 1933, 1942, 1943, 1944
 Mitropa Cup (1): 1937

International
Hungary
 FIFA World Cup runner-up: 1938
 Central European International Cup third place: 1931–32, 1933–35

Manager

Club
Juventus
 Serie A: 1951–52

Individual
 FIFA World Cup Bronze Ball: 1938
 FIFA World Cup Bronze Boot: 1938
 FIFA World Cup All-Star Team: 1938
 Central European International Cup: Top scorer 1933–35
 World Soccer: The 100 Greatest Footballers of All Time
 Mitropa Cup top scorer: 1935, 1937, 1940
 Nemzeti Bajnokság I top scorer: 1935–36, 1939–40, 1940–41
 Nemzeti Bajnokság I unofficial top scorer: 1944

See also 
 List of men's footballers with 500 or more goals
 The 100 Greatest Players of the 20th Century

References

1912 births
1993 deaths
Hungarian footballers
Hungarian people of Croatian descent
Nemzeti Bajnokság I players
Ferencvárosi TC footballers
Hungarian football managers
1934 FIFA World Cup players
1938 FIFA World Cup players
Hungary international footballers
S.S.C. Bari managers
S.S.D. Lucchese 1905 managers
Juventus F.C. managers
Genoa C.F.C. managers
A.S. Roma managers
Bologna F.C. 1909 managers
Brescia Calcio managers
Serie A managers
Expatriate football managers in Italy
Expatriate football managers in Switzerland
FC Lugano managers
Association football forwards
Hungarian expatriate sportspeople in Italy
Hungarian expatriate sportspeople in Switzerland
Footballers from Budapest